The Provisional Government of the Republic of China  was a provisional government established during the Xinhai Revolution by the revolutionaries in 1912. After the success of the Wuchang Uprising, revolutionary provincial assembly representatives held a conference in the district of Wuchang, China, which framed the organizational outline of the Provisional Government.

Planning
In November 1911 the revolutionary group in the Wuchang District of Wuhan, China, led by Li Yuanhong came together with the revolutionary group in Shanghai led by Chen Qimei and Cheng Dequan (程德全) to prepare for the establishment of a new central government.  The districts of Wuhan would unify in 1927. The group in Wuchang wanted to establish a government in Wuchang, while the group in Shanghai wanted a government in Shanghai.  By November 20 the two groups compromised and recognized Hubei as the central government and proposed everyone go to Wuchang.  By November 28, Hankou and Hanyang had fallen back to the Qing, so for safety the revolutionaries convened their first conference at the British concession in Hankou on November 30.  Tan Renfeng (譚人鳳) was the chairman of the session.  Twenty-three representatives from the 11 provinces participated. The representatives decided to frame the organizational outline of the Provisional Government, and they elected Lei Fen (雷奮), Ma Junwu, and Wang Zhengting (王正廷) to prepare the draft.

Because on December 2 the revolutionary forces were able to capture Nanking in the uprising, the revolutionaries decided to make it the site of the new provisional government. The conference passed the outline the very next day, which consisted three chapters and twenty-one clauses.   It also confirmed that the new government would be a republic. It was announced that the provincial representatives would meet in Nanking in seven days to elect a provisional government.

President selection

Instead of attending Nanking's assembly, Song Jiaoren and Chen Qimei gathered the provincial representatives in Shanghai and held an assembly on December 4. On December 25, Sun Yat-sen, accompanied by general Homer Lea, his closest foreign adviser, returned to Shanghai. On December 29, the presidential election was held in Nanking. According to the first article of the "Provisional Government Organization Outline", the Provisional President was to be elected by representatives from the provinces of China; the candidate who received more than 2/3 of the votes would be elected. Each province was entitled to one vote only. 45 representatives from seventeen provinces participated in this election, and Sun Yat-sen received 16 valid votes out of 17.

Establishment of government

On 1 January 1912, Sun Yat-sen announced the establishment of the Republic of China in Nanking, and he was inaugurated as the Provisional President of the Republic. General Li Yuanhong was made Provisional Vice President.  Under the Provisional Government, there were ten ministries:

 Huang Xing was appointed both as the Minister of the Army and as Chief of Staff
 Huang Zhongying as the Minister of the Navy
 Wang Chonghui as the Minister of Foreign Affairs
 Wu Tingfang as the Minister of the Judiciary
 Chen Jingtao as the Minister of Finance
 Cheng Dequan as the Minister of Internal Affairs
 Cai Yuanpei as the Minister of Education
 Zhang Jian as the Minister of Commerce
 Tang Soqian as the Minister of Communications.

There were additional appointments, such as Hu Hanmin as the Secretary of the President, Song Jiaoren as the Director-general of Law-making, and Huang Fusheng as the Director-general of Printing.  The speaker of the Provisional Senate was Lin Sen.

Northern transition

Dong'anmen Gate incident
The revolutionaries were trying to lure Yuan Shikai to the south.  By making Yuan the president of the southern Nanking-based provisional government, he would have to give up his military power base in the north.  In February 1912, troops were looting shops and stealing from rich commercial areas.  They then burned down the Dong'anmen gate (東安門) on the wall surrounding the Imperial City.  Thousands of people were killed.  This mutiny was actually ordered by Yuan and Cao Kun.  Yuan intimidated the revolutionaries and made it clear that the new government would have to go to him in Peking, he was not going to the south.  This was an excuse to move the capital of the new republic from Nanking back to Peking.

End of provisional government

Yuan Shikai, the Premier of the Qing government, negotiated with the revolutionaries in exchange of the post of the president. Avoiding a civil war, the revolutionaries agreed to Yuan's plan of the unified China under Yuan's government.  On 8 March 1912 the Provisional Senate passed the Provisional Constitution to limit Yuan's power in the future. On March 10, the Senate elected Yuan as the second Provisional President of the Republic. The power of the Nanking Government and the Provisional Senate hence transitioned to the Beiyang government in Peking, which signified the dissolution of the Provisional Government.  The transition to the north in the next few years would be challenging with factions, warlords, constitutional movements and many other issues.

See also 

 Provisional Constitution of the Republic of China
 History of the Republic of China

References

External links 
 

1911 Revolution
1912 in China
Provisional governments